Detonator is the fifth studio album by American glam metal band Ratt, released August 21, 1990 by Atlantic Records. This is the last album to feature bassist Juan Croucier until his return in 2012, as well as guitarist Robbin Crosby before his death in 2002.

Though their previous album Reach for the Sky went platinum, it met with some criticism regarding the quality of their songs. In an attempt to regain the popularity that Ratt had in the mid-1980s, the band parted ways with long-time producer Beau Hill. Songwriter Desmond Child and his personal sound engineer Arthur Payson were hired as producers for the album. The album is notable for featuring Ratt's only power ballad, "Givin' Yourself Away". The band also gravitated towards a more glam metal/pop metal sound on Detonator.

Track listing

Personnel
Ratt
Stephen Pearcy – lead and backing vocals
Robbin Crosby – rhythm guitar, backing vocals
Warren DeMartini – lead guitar, backing vocals
Juan Croucier – bass guitar, backing vocals
Bobby Blotzer – drums and percussion

Guest musicians
Jon Bon Jovi – backing vocals on "Heads I Win, Tails You Lose"
Myriam Valle – backing vocals on "All or Nothing"
Myriam Valle, Desmond Child – additional backing vocals
Michael Schenker – tag on "Shame Shame Shame"
Steve Deutsch – sample and synth programming
David Garfield – keyboards

Production
Sir Arthur Payson – producer, engineer
Desmond Child – executive producer
Steve Heinke, Lawrence Ethan, Jesse Kanner – assistant engineers
Mike Shipley – mixing at The Enterprise in Burbank, California
Bob Ludwig – mastering at Masterdisk in New York City

Charts

Album

Singles

Certifications

References

1990 albums
Albums produced by Desmond Child
Atlantic Records albums
Ratt albums